Charles T. Kimball (November 15, 1872 – February 18, 1949) was a Republican member of the Michigan House of Representatives.  He was a native of Jonesville, and represented Hillsdale County in the legislature.  He was a survivor of the Kerns Hotel fire in Lansing of December 11, 1934.

References

Republican Party members of the Michigan House of Representatives
People from Jonesville, Michigan
1872 births
1949 deaths